Leftover Cuties are an American band formed in Los Angeles, California in 2008. The band consists of Shirli McAllen (lead vocals, ukulele), Austin Nicholsen (bass, vocals), Mike Bolger (brass, keys, accordion, vocals ) and Stuart Johnson (drums, percussion, vocals). The Showtime original series The Big C used a song by the band as its theme music. The band's most recent singles have received coverage in Paste (magazine) and The A.V. Club. The band's most recent album, The Spark & The Fire, was released July 23, 2013.

Discography

External links
 official website

References

Musical groups from Los Angeles